Contiki is an operating system for networked, memory-constrained systems with a focus on low-power wireless Internet of Things (IoT) devices. Contiki is used for systems for street lighting, sound monitoring for smart cities, radiation monitoring and alarms. It is open-source software released under the BSD-3-Clause license.

Contiki was created by Adam Dunkels in 2002 and has been further developed by a worldwide team of developers from Texas Instruments, Atmel, Cisco, ENEA, ETH Zurich, Redwire, RWTH Aachen University, Oxford University, SAP, Sensinode, Swedish Institute of Computer Science, ST Microelectronics, Zolertia, and many others. Contiki gained popularity because of its built in TCP/IP stack and lightweight preemptive scheduling over event-driven kernel which is a very motivating feature for IoT. The name Contiki comes from Thor Heyerdahl's famous Kon-Tiki raft.

Contiki provides multitasking and a built-in Internet Protocol Suite (TCP/IP stack), yet needs only about 10 kilobytes of random-access memory (RAM) and 30 kilobytes of read-only memory (ROM). A full system, including a graphical user interface, needs about 30 kilobytes of RAM.

A new branch has recently been created, known as Contiki-NG: The OS for Next Generation IoT Devices

Hardware
Contiki is designed to run on types of hardware devices that are severely constrained in memory, power, processing power, and communication bandwidth. A typical Contiki system has memory on the order of kilobytes, a power budget on the order of milliwatts, processing speed measured in megaHertz, and communication bandwidth on the order of hundreds of kilobits/second. Such systems include many types of embedded systems, and old 8-bit computers.

Networking
Contiki provides three network mechanisms: the uIP TCP/IP stack, which provides IPv4 networking, the uIPv6 stack, which provides IPv6 networking, and the Rime stack, which is a set of custom lightweight networking protocols designed for low-power wireless networks. The IPv6 stack was contributed by Cisco and was, when released, the smallest IPv6 stack to receive the IPv6 Ready certification. The IPv6 stack also contains the Routing Protocol for Low power and Lossy Networks (RPL) routing protocol for low-power lossy IPv6 networks and the 6LoWPAN header compression and adaptation layer for IEEE 802.15.4 links.

Rime is an alternative network stack, for use when the overhead of the IPv4 or IPv6 stacks is prohibitive. The Rime stack provides a set of communication primitives for low-power wireless systems. The default primitives are single-hop unicast, single-hop broadcast, multi-hop unicast, network flooding, and address-free data collection. The primitives can be used on their own or combined to form more complex protocols and mechanisms.

Low-power operation
Many Contiki systems are severely power-constrained. Battery operated wireless sensors may need to provide years of unattended operation and with little means to recharge or replace batteries. Contiki provides a set of mechanisms to reduce the power consumption of systems on which it runs. The default mechanism for attaining low-power operation of the radio is called ContikiMAC. With ContikiMAC, nodes can be running in low-power mode and still be able to receive and relay radio messages.

Simulation
The Contiki system includes a sensor simulator called Cooja, which simulates of Contiki nodes. The nodes belong to one of the three following classes: a) emulated Cooja nodes, b) Contiki code compiled and executed on the simulation host, or c) Java nodes, where the behavior of the node must be reimplemented as a Java class. One Cooja simulation may contain a mix of sensor nodes from any of the three classes. Emulated nodes can also be used to include non-Contiki nodes in a simulated network.

In Contiki 2.6, platforms with the TI MSP430 and Atmel AVR microcontrollers can be emulated.

Programming model
To run efficiently on small-memory systems, the Contiki programming model is based on protothreads. A protothread is a memory-efficient programming abstraction that shares features of both multithreading and event-driven programming to attain a low memory overhead of each protothread. The kernel invokes the protothread of a process in response to an internal or external event. Examples of internal events are timers that fire or messages being posted from other processes. Examples of external events are sensors that trigger or incoming packets from a radio neighbor.

Protothreads are cooperatively scheduled. Thus, a Contiki process must always explicitly yield control back to the kernel at regular intervals. Contiki processes may use a special protothread construct to block waiting for events while yielding control to the kernel between each event invocation.

Features 

Contiki supports per-process optional preemptive multithreading, inter-process communication using message passing through events, as well as an optional graphical user interface (GUI) subsystem with either direct graphic support for locally connected terminals or networked virtual display with Virtual Network Computing (VNC) or over Telnet.

A full installation of Contiki includes the following features:
 Multitasking kernel
 Optional per-application preemptive multithreading
 Protothreads
 Internet Protocol Suite (TCP/IP) networking, including IPv6
 Windowing system and GUI
 Networked remote display using Virtual Network Computing
 A web browser (claimed to be the world's smallest)
 Personal web server
 Simple telnet client
 Screensaver

Contiki is supported by popular SSL/TLS libraries such as wolfSSL, which includes a port in its 3.15.5 release.

Ports 

The Contiki operating system is ported to the following systems:

Microcontrollers
 Atmel – ARM, AVR
 NXP Semiconductors – LPC1768, LPC2103, MC13224
 Microchip – dsPIC, PIC32 (PIC32MX795F512L)
 Texas Instruments – MSP430, CC2430, CC2538, CC2630, CC2650, CC2538: cctv, Firefly, Zoul (comprises the CC2538 and CC1200 in a single module format)
 STMicroelectronics – STM32 W

Computers
 Apple – II series
 Atari – 8-bit, ST, Portfolio
 Casio – Pocket Viewer
 Commodore – PET, VIC-20, 64, 128
 Tangerine Computer Systems – Oric
 NEC – PC-6001
 Sharp – Wizard
 Intel, AMD, VIA, many others – x86-based Unix-like systems, atop GTK+, or more directly using an X Window System

Game consoles
 Atari – Jaguar
 Game Park – GP32
 Nintendo – Game Boy, Game Boy Advance, Entertainment System (NES)
 NEC – TurboGrafx-16 Entertainment SuperSystem (PC Engine)

See also 

 BeRTOS
 ERIKA Enterprise
 Nano-RK
 RIOT
 SymbOS
 TinyOS
 Wheels (operating system)
 Comparison of real-time operating systems

Notes

References

 : unofficial website for historic ports of the 1.x version.
 .
 .
 .

External links

 
 
 

Embedded operating systems
Free web browsers
Free software operating systems
TRS-80 Color Computer
Commodore 64 software
Commodore 128 software
Apple II software
Atari 8-bit family software
Atari ST software
VIC-20 software
ARM operating systems
MIPS operating systems
Software using the BSD license